, or S kankei, abbreviated either as S or , is an early twentieth-century Japanese wasei-eigo term used to refer to romantic friendships between girls. The "S" is an abbreviation that can stand for "sister", "sex", "" (German: beautiful), and "escape".

Although Class S can broadly be described as a form of love between girls, it is distinct from a romantic relationship or romance fiction in that it is used specifically to describe platonic relationships based on strong emotional bonds and very close friendship, rather than sex or sexual attraction.

History

Origins
The western novels Little Women and A Little Princess were translated into Japanese in 1906 and 1910, respectively, in order to educate the girls to become "good wives, wise mothers". These works also helped introduce the concepts of laotong, sisterhood, sentimentalism, and romance to young female audiences in Japan, with Jo of Little Women in particular becoming a prominent example of a tomboy character.

Class S was also influenced by the Takarazuka Revue, an all-women theater troupe established in 1914. The revue featured women actors playing male roles referred to as  who would romance female characters. Around this time, the term  was coined to describe butch and femme relationships, as well as relationships between two femmes, with femmes referred to as ome. It was suggested in popular media of the time that the Takarazuka otokoyaku caused women in Class S relationships to become ome and persist in homosexual relationships long after it was acceptable.  Jennifer Robertson argues that "many females are attracted to the Takarazuka otokoyaku because she represents an exemplary female who can negotiate successfully both genders and their attendant roles and domains."

The rapid creation of all-girls' schools during this period is also regarded as having contributed to Class S: by 1913, there were 213 such schools.

Decline and revival
In 1936, Class S literature was banned by the Japanese government. The ban was lifted after World War II, along with restrictions on depictions of male-female romance in girls' magazines. This, combined with the closure of girls' schools in favor of co-educational schools and the mainstreaming of the free love movement, led Class S to decline as both a literary genre and a social phenomenon.

Class S literature experienced a revival of popularity in the late 1990s. The 1998 yuri light novel series Maria-sama ga Miteru is credited with reviving the Class S genre, and is considered to be a modern equivalent to Nobuko Yoshiya's Hana Monogatari.

Influence and legacy

As a social phenomenon
A 1911 article in Fujin Kōron claimed that between seven and eight women out of ten had experienced Class S relationships.

Class S relationships were typically regarded as not a genuine expression of same-sex attraction. So long as these relationships remained confined to adolescence they were regarded as normal, even spiritual. This attitude would later inform contemporary perspectives on lesbianism in Japan: a tolerance towards non-sexual intimacy between girls, and the widespread belief that female homosexuality is a "phase".

As literary genre
Class S had a significant impact on the Japanese literary tradition of depicting friendship between girls, the development of Japanese lesbian literature, and the creation of the anime and manga genre yuri.

Notable figures
Nobuko Yoshiya, a lesbian Japanese novelist active in the Bluestocking feminist movement, is regarded as a pioneer of Class S literature.

See also
 Homosexuality in Japan
 Lesbian teen fiction
 Situational sexual behavior
 Romantic friendship

Notes

References 
 
 

Anime and manga terminology
Japanese culture
Japanese literature
Japanese sex terms
Lesbian fiction
LGBT fiction
Literary genres
Yuri (genre)
Girls